The Stone Lakes National Wildlife Refuge, located south of Sacramento, California, lies within the Sacramento-San Joaquin delta, the destination of thousands of migrating waterfowl, shorebirds, and other water birds. The refuge was established in 1994.

Habitats
Through a number of innovative partnerships, the refuge is protecting scarce natural habitats and agricultural resources in an area threatened by urban sprawl and agricultural changes. Stone Lakes National Wildlife Refuge contains both seasonal and permanent wetlands, riparian forest, and grasslands, as well as some of the last remaining freshwater lakes in the central valley.

These habitats support large populations of migratory water birds, a major rookery for several colonial nesting species such as great blue herons, and a warm water fishery. Several endangered, threatened, and special-status species benefit from these habitats: the valley elderberry longhorn beetle, Swainson's hawk, and greater sandhill crane.

Visitors
Visitor numbers increase every year; they topped 8,500 in 2001, despite a lack of developed facilities such as a visitor education center and restrooms. Volunteers from the local area dedicate their time on weekends guiding visitors through grasslands and tree-lined waterways to educate the public about the refuge in their backyard.

References

External links

official Stone Lakes National Wildlife Refuge website
Stone Lakes National Wildlife Refuge profile

National Wildlife Refuges in California
Protected areas of Sacramento County, California
Parks in the San Joaquin Valley
Natural history of the Central Valley (California)
Protected areas established in 1994
Wetlands of California
Landforms of Sacramento County, California